Lars Rasmussen (born 9 April 1976) is a former Danish team handball player. He was European Champion by winning the 2008 European Men's Handball Championship with the Danish national handball team. He received a bronze medal at the 2007 World Men's Handball Championship.

He is currently head coach for KIF Kolding.

References

External links

1976 births
Living people
Danish handball coaches
Danish male handball players
Sportspeople from the Capital Region of Denmark